The 2021-22 RPI Engineers Men's ice hockey season was the 102nd season of play for the program and the 60th season in the ECAC Hockey conference. The Engineers represented Rensselaer Polytechnic Institute and played their home games at Houston Field House, and were coached by Dave Smith, in his 4th season.

Season
Rensselaer returned to the ice after losing all of last season to the COVID-19 pandemic. The team began the year with a decent start, albeit against fairly weak competition. But looked to be in good standing after taking down Clarkson in early November. However, the following week, the Engineers were embarrassed by Cornell 3–11, the program's worst loss in decades. Afterwards, the defense recovered but the team was soon beset by a lack of offense over a several week span. RPI ended their first half with a 2–6 run with the only saving grace being that five of those losses were to non-conference teams.

After returning from the winter break, Rensselaer was forced to postpone or cancel several games in early January due to an increase in positive COVID-19 tests. When they did began playing games, the team also found itself in need of a new starting goaltender as presumptive primary netminder, Linden Marshall, had not performed well enough to retain the job. Newcomer Jack Watson was a bit inconsistent in his early appearances, but he possessed a higher ceiling than Marshall and Dave Smith eventually settled on the freshman as the starter. The offense also saw a steady improvement after returning to action but remained hot and cold for the remainder of the regular season. RPI would regularly follow stunning victories with confounding losses and ended the year just under .500. However, with a 6th-place finish, they did at least receive a home site for the first round of the conference tournament.

Despite having Marshall in net for the regular season finale, Watson led the Engineers into the postseason. Despite vastly outshooting Dartmouth in the opening match, RPI fell 2–3. The offense continued to pressure the Big Green net in the next two games and took advantage of several power play opportunities, riding their special team to consecutive wins and advancing to the quarterfinals. Rensselaer took control of the first game when they gained a 3–0 lead early in the third period. Watson kept Harvard off of the scoresheet despite a barrage of shots but, after the Crimson pulled their goaltender, the tide began to turn. RPI was swarmed over by Harvard and surrendered 3 goals in the final 4 minutes, all with the aide of an extra attacker. The momentum remained with their opponents and the Engineers allowed the winning goal just 2 minutes into overtime.

The second game did not have quite as much drama but it still saw Harvard tying the game late and force overtime once more. Watson was again called upon to stop a multitude of Crimson shots but this time he held his ground in the extra frame and sent the match into a second overtime. John Beaton saved the Engineer's season with the winner and set up a deciding third game. Watson was up to the task, holding Harvard to 2 goals, but the offense was not. RPI was stymied by the Crimson defense and the team fell 1–3.

Departures

Recruiting

Roster
As of August 19, 2021.

Standings

Schedule and results

|-
!colspan=12 style=";" | Exhibition

|-
!colspan=12 style=";" | Regular Season

|-
!colspan=12 style=";" | 

|- align="center" bgcolor="#e0e0e0"
|colspan=12|Rensselaer Won Series 2–1

|- align="center" bgcolor="#e0e0e0"
|colspan=12|Rensselaer Lost Series 1–2

Scoring statistics

Goaltending statistics

Rankings

Note: USCHO did not release a poll in week 24.

Awards and honors

References

2021-22
RPI Engineers
RPI Engineers
RPI Engineers
RPI Engineers